German Type UB submarine may refer to:

 German Type UB I submarine of WW1
 German Type UB II submarine of WW1
 German Type UB III submarine of WW1

See also
 German submarine UB of WW2